Rongel may refer to:
 Rongel Point
 Rongel Reef
 Ary Rongel (H-44)